Byrdie Bell (born Evelyn Byrd Bell on March 13, 1985) is an American actress and model.

Early life, education, and family
Evelyn Byrd Bell was born in Chicago. She attended Greenwich Country Day School in Greenwich, Connecticut and the United Nations International School in New York City. After studying at HB Studio in New York City and the British American Drama Academy in London, Bell graduated from the Stella Adler Conservatory program.

Bell is a descendant of Colonel William Byrd II, the founder of Richmond, Virginia. Her mother, Evelyn Lorentzen Bell, is the great granddaughter of Øivind Lorentzen whose son, Erling, is related through marriage to the Norwegian royal family.

Her father Ted Bell was the Vice Chairman of the Board and Creative Director of Young & Rubicam, one of the world's largest advertising agencies.

Career
In 2009, Bell was hired as an actor on HaAh HaGadol 2, the Israeli version of the reality show Big Brother in a strategic attempt to confuse the competing cast. She had a small part in Martin Scorsese's Rolling Stones documentary Shine a Light. Bell had wanted to release two independent films; Blinders (with Nathaniel Brown and Luke Worrall) and Tragic Fairytale in 2011, but they were not purchased.

At age eighteen, Bell began modeling. She has appeared in the pages of magazines including Vogue, V Magazine, Harper's Bazaar, Paper Planes, and Dossier Journal.

In 2010, she was recognized in The New York Times "Nifty 50" as one of America's top 50 up-and-coming talents.

She has modeled in campaigns for Hogan, NAHM, Rad Hourani, Meredith Kahn, Bloomingdale's, and Club Monaco.

In September 2011, Bell became a featured editor for Piperlime.

References

External links
 
 

Living people
1985 births
Big Brother (franchise) contestants
American film actresses
Actresses from Greenwich, Connecticut
21st-century American actresses
American people of Norwegian descent
Stella Adler Studio of Acting alumni
Actresses from Chicago
Alumni of the British American Drama Academy
United Nations International School alumni